Pszczółczyn  is a village in the administrative district of Gmina Łabiszyn, within Żnin County, Kuyavian-Pomeranian Voivodeship, in north-central Poland.

The village has a population of 100.

References

Villages in Żnin County